Martin Bakoš (born 20 April 1990) is a Slovak professional ice hockey player currently under contract with HC Oceláři Třinec of the Czech Extraliga (ELH).

Playing career
Undrafted, Bakoš began his professional career within his native Slovakia, playing with Slovan Bratislava in the Slovak Extraliga in the 2007–08 season.

After his 10th professional European season, having also played in the Czech Extraliga and Kontinental Hockey League, Bakoš opted to pursue his NHL aspirations in signing as a free agent to a one-year, two-way contract with the Boston Bruins of the National Hockey League (NHL) on 14 June 2018. After attending the Bruins' training camp, Bakoš was assigned to begin the 2018–19 season with American Hockey League (AHL) affiliate, the Providence Bruins.

Bakoš appeared in 16 games with Providence, collecting just three goals, before he was placed on unconditional waivers in order for a mutual termination of his contract by the Boston Bruins on 10 December 2018. On 18 December, Bakoš signed with Sochi of the KHL until the end of the 2018–19 season. He was productive in his short tenure with Sochi, collecting 15 points through 22 games.

As a free agent, Bakoš was signed to a one-year contract to continue in the KHL with Admiral Vladivostok on 21 June 2019. In his lone season with Vladivostok, Bakoš was the club's leading scorer totalling 42 points in 61 games, however he was unable to prevent Admiral finishing as the lowest ranked Russian club in the 2019–20 season.

With the ambition to play in the post-season, Bakoš left Vladivostok as a free agent and signed an optional two-year contract with HC Spartak Moscow on 10 May 2020. In the following 2020–21 season, Bakoš was unable to match his previous season scoring rate, registering 14 goals and 28 points through 45 regular season games.

Leaving Spartak after a lone season, Bakoš continued in the KHL by agreeing to a one-year contract in a return to HC Sochi on 2 May 2021.

Career statistics

Regular season and playoffs

International

References

External links
 

1990 births
Living people
Admiral Vladivostok players
HK 36 Skalica players
HC Bílí Tygři Liberec players
HC Kunlun Red Star players
Ice hockey players at the 2018 Winter Olympics
HC Oceláři Třinec players
Olympic ice hockey players of Slovakia
Sportspeople from Spišská Nová Ves
Providence Bruins players
Slovak ice hockey left wingers
Slovak expatriate sportspeople in China
HC Slovan Bratislava players
HC Sochi players
HC Spartak Moscow players
Slovak expatriate ice hockey players in the United States
Slovak expatriate ice hockey players in Russia
Expatriate ice hockey players in China
Slovak expatriate ice hockey players in the Czech Republic
Slovak expatriate ice hockey players in Switzerland